Khalid Ahmed is a Pakistani TV director, producer and actor. He currently teaches theatre at National Academy of Performing Arts.

Early life and education 
Born in Patna, Bihar, India, he moved to Pakistan in his teens, during the 1970s, and despite being inclined towards the arts from an early age (he learned to play the banjo and the Hawaiian guitar), he initially graduated as an engineer from the University of California, also teaching the subject for some time at the NED University, Karachi, before studying theater at the London Academy of Music and Dramatic Art. Through his sister, his nephew is Bollywood director Imtiaz Ali.

Television

As actor
 Uraan as Asjad
 Bilqees Kaur as Iqbal Bhatti 
 Zindagi Gulzar Hai as Murtaza's elder brother
 Talkhiyaan as Agha Husain Baig a.k.a. Agha Jaan
 Digest Writer as Mazhar Hayat
 Dilara (special appearance)
 Churails (Web Series)

As a writer 
 Kitni Girhain Baaki Hain (Episode 2, 6, 25)

As a director 
 Firdous ki Dozakh
 Pehchaan
 Dilara

Filmography

As an actor
 Chambaili
 Actor in Law (Special Appearance)
 Pinky Memsaab as Qutb
 Intezar

As a Director
 Laloolal.com (2016)
 Daani (2006)

Stage plays
 Kal Agar Main Marjaun (What If I Die Tomorrow) (2021)
 Bedroom Conversations (2020)
 Badshahat Ka Khatma (written by Saadat Hasan Manto) (2013)
 Naql-e-Makani (written by Rajinder Singh Bedi) (2013)

Awards and accolades 

 Best Actor award at Harlem International Film Festival - Intezar

See also
 National Academy of Performing Arts

References

External links
 

Living people
Pakistani television directors
Pakistani television producers
Businesspeople from Karachi
Pakistani people of Bihari descent
People from Patna
Year of birth missing (living people)